Baked beans is a dish traditionally containing white beans that are parboiled and then, in the US, baked in sauce at low temperature for a lengthy period. In the United Kingdom, the dish is sometimes baked, but usually stewed in sauce. Canned baked beans are not baked, but are cooked through a steam process.

Baked beans occurred in Native American cuisine, and are made from beans indigenous to the Americas. It is thought that the dish was adopted and adapted by English colonists in New England in the 17th century and, through cookbooks published in the 19th century, spread to other regions of the United States and into Canada. However, the connection to Native American cuisine may be apocryphal, as legumes such as broad beans and lentils prepared in various sauces had been established in European cuisine long before the Middle Ages.  Today, in the New England region of the United States, a variety of indigenous legumes are used in restaurants or in the home, such as Jacob's cattle, soldier beans, yellow-eyed beans, and navy beans (also known as native beans).

Originally, Native Americans sweetened baked beans with maple syrup, a tradition some recipes still follow, but some English colonists used brown sugar beginning in the 17th century. In the 18th century, the convention of using American-made molasses as a sweetening agent became increasingly popular to avoid British taxes on sugar. Boston baked beans use a sauce prepared with molasses and salt pork, a dish whose popularity has given Boston the nickname "Beantown". 

Today, baked beans are served throughout the United States alongside barbecue foods and at picnics. Beans in a brown sugar, sugar, or corn syrup sauce (with or without tomatoes) are widely available throughout the United States. Bush Brothers are the largest producer. After the American Revolutionary War, Independence Day celebrations often included baked beans.

Canned baked beans are used as a convenience food; most are made from haricot beans in sauce. They may be eaten hot or cold, and  straight from the can, as they are fully cooked. H. J. Heinz began producing canned baked beans in 1886. In the early 20th century, canned baked beans gained international popularity, particularly in the United Kingdom, where they have become a common part of an English full breakfast.

Origins and history in the Americas

According to chef and food historian Walter Staib of Philadelphia's City Tavern, baked beans had their roots as a Native peoples dish in the Americas long before the dish became known to Western culture. In the northeast of America various Native American peoples, including the Iroquois, the Narragansett and the Penobscot, mixed beans, maple sugar, and bear fat in earthenware pots which they placed in pits called "bean holes" which were lined in hot rocks to cook slowly over a long period of time.

British colonists in New England were the first westerners to adopt the dish from the Native peoples, and were quick to embrace it largely because the dish was reminiscent of pease porridge and because the dish used ingredients native to the New World. They substituted molasses or sugar for the maple syrup, bacon or ham for the bear fat, and simmered their beans for hours in pots over the fire instead of underground. Each colony in America had its own regional variations of the dish, with navy or white pea beans used in Massachusetts, Jacob's Cattle and soldier beans used in Maine, and yellow-eyed beans in Vermont. This variation likely resulted from the colonists receiving the dish from different Native peoples who used different native beans.

While some historians have theorized that baked beans had originated from the cassoulet or bean stew tradition in Southern France, this is unlikely as the beans used to make baked beans are all native to North America and were introduced to Europe around 1528. However, it is likely that English colonists used their knowledge of cassoulet cooking to modify the cooking technique of the beans from the traditional Native American version, by soaking the bean overnight and simmering the beans over a fire before baking it in earthen pots in order to decrease the cooking time. 

A dish which was a clear precursor to baked beans, entitled "beans and bacon", was known in medieval England. The addition of onion and mustard to some baked beans recipes published in New England in the 19th century was likely based on traditional cassoulet recipes from Staffordshire, England which utilized mustard, beans, and leeks. These ingredients are still often added to baked beans today. Nineteenth-century cookbooks published in New England, spread to other portions of the United States and Canada, which familiarized other people with the dish.

While many recipes today are stewed, traditionally dried beans were soaked overnight, simmered until tender (parboiled), and then slow-baked in a ceramic or cast-iron beanpot. Originally baked beans were sweetened with maple syrup by Native Americans, a tradition some recipes still follow, but some English colonists modified the sweetening agent to brown sugar beginning in the 17th century. In the 18th century the convention of using American made molasses as a sweetening agent became increasingly popular in order to avoid British taxes on sugar. The molasses style of baked beans has become closely associated with the city of Boston and is often referred to as Boston baked beans.

Today in the New England region, baked beans are flavored either with maple syrup (Northern New England), or with molasses (Boston), and are traditionally cooked with salt pork in a beanpot in a brick oven for six to eight hours. In the absence of a brick oven, the beans were cooked in a beanpot nestled in a bed of embers placed near the outer edges of a hearth, about a foot away from the fire. Today, baked beans can be made in a slow cooker or in a modern oven using a traditional beanpot, Dutch oven, or casserole dish. Regardless of cooking method, the results of the dish, commonly described as having a savory-sweet flavor and a brownish- or reddish-tinted white bean, are the same.

A tradition in Maine of "bean hole" cooking may have originated with the native Penobscot people and was later practiced in logging camps. A fire would be made in a stone-lined pit and allowed to burn down to hot coals, and then a pot with 11 pounds of seasoned beans would be placed in the ashes, covered over with dirt, and left to cook overnight or longer. These beans were a staple of Maine's logging camps, served at every meal.

While baked beans was initially a New England region cuisine, the dish has become a popular item throughout the United States; and is now a staple item served most frequently along various types of barbecue and at picnics. This is due in part to the ease of handling, as they can be served hot or cold, directly from the can, making them handy for outdoor eating. The tomato-based sweet sauce also complements many types of barbecue. The already-cooked beans may also be baked in a casserole dish topped with slices of raw bacon, which is baked until the bacon is cooked. Additional seasonings are sometimes used, such as additional brown sugar or mustard to make the sauce more tangy.

Commercial production and international consumption
Canned beans, often containing pork, were among the first convenience foods, and were exported and popularised by U.S. companies internationally in the early 20th century. The American Food and Drug Administration stated in 1996: "It has for years been recognized by consumers generally that the designation 'beans with pork,' or 'pork and beans' is the common or usual name for an article of commerce that contains very little pork." The included pork is typically a piece of salt pork that adds fat to the dish.

The first mass-produced commercial canning of baked beans in the United States began in 1895 by the Pennsylvania-based H. J. Heinz Company. Heinz was also the first company to sell baked beans outside of the United States, beginning with sales limited solely to Fortnum & Mason in 1886, when the item was considered a luxury. They began selling baked beans throughout the UK in 1901, and baked beans became a standard part of the English full breakfast soon after. Heinz removed pork from the product during the Second World War rationing. 

Originally, Heinz Baked Beans were prepared in the traditional United States manner for sales in Ireland and Great Britain. Over time, the recipe was altered to a less sweet tomato sauce without maple syrup, molasses, or brown sugar to appeal to the tastes of the United Kingdom. This is the version of baked beans most commonly eaten outside of the United States. Baked beans are commonly eaten on toast ("beans on toast") or as part of a full breakfast. Heinz Baked Beans remains the best-selling brand in the UK. The Baked Bean Museum of Excellence in Port Talbot, Wales, is dedicated to baked beans.

Health
In 2002, the British Dietetic Association allowed manufacturers of canned baked beans to advertise the product as contributing to the recommended daily consumption of five to six vegetables per person. This concession was criticised by heart specialists, who pointed to the high levels of sugar and salt in the product. However, it has been proven that consumption of baked beans does indeed lower total cholesterol levels and low-density lipoprotein cholesterol, even in normo-cholesterolaemic individuals. Some manufacturers produce a "healthy" version of the product with reduced levels of sugar and salt.

Flatulence 
Baked beans are known on occasion to cause an increase in flatulence following consumption; this is due to the fermentation of polysaccharides (specifically oligosaccharides) by gut bacteria. The oligosaccharides pass through the small intestine largely undigested; when they reach the large intestine, they are digested by the bacteria, producing gas.

See also

 List of legume dishes
 List of toast dishes
 Pork and beans
 Refried beans
 Beans, Beans, the Musical Fruit, a playground saying referring to the capacity for baked beans to cause increased flatulence

References

 
Canned food
British cuisine
English cuisine
Irish cuisine
Legume dishes
Baked foods
American cuisine
Canadian cuisine
Australian cuisine
New Zealand cuisine
Cuisine of Quebec
Chilean cuisine
Turkish cuisine
Iranian cuisine
Mexican cuisine
Cuisine of the Thirteen Colonies
Independence Day (United States) foods